Lieutenant-Colonel George Herbert Windsor Windsor-Clive (12 March 1835 – 26 April 1918) was a British Conservative Party politician.

Windsor-Clive was a younger son of  Robert Henry Clive, grandson of Edward Clive, 1st Earl of Powis, and great-grandson of Robert Clive, 1st Baron Clive ("Clive of India"). His mother was Harriet Windsor, 13th Baroness Windsor, daughter of Other Hickman Windsor, 5th Earl of Plymouth, while Robert Windsor-Clive was his elder brother and Robert Windsor-Clive, 1st Earl of Plymouth, his nephew. 

He was elected to the House of Commons as Member of Parliament (MP) for Ludlow at a by-election in 1860, a seat he held until he retired from Parliament at the 1885 general election.

Windsor-Clive married Gertrude Albertine, daughter of Charles Rodolph Trefusis, 19th Baron Clinton, in 1876. She died in April 1878. Their son George succeeded his father as MP for Ludlow.

Windsor-Clive remained a widower until his death in April 1918, aged 83.

References

External links 
 
 "Hon. George H.W. Windsor-Clive", Debrett's Illustrated House of Common, publ. 1867

1835 births
1918 deaths
Younger sons of barons
Conservative Party (UK) MPs for English constituencies
UK MPs 1859–1865
UK MPs 1865–1868
UK MPs 1868–1874
UK MPs 1874–1880
UK MPs 1880–1885
Members of the Parliament of the United Kingdom for constituencies in Shropshire